The galjoen, black bream, or blackfish (Dichistius capensis) is a species of marine fish found only along the  coast of southern Africa from Angola to South Africa.  
Galjoen is the national fish of South Africa.

Distribution and habitat

Description
The body is compressed, and the fins are well developed, with prominent spines,  10 of them, with between 18 and 23 rays. The anal fin has three spines, and usually 13 or 14 rays, the pelvic fins have 1 spine and 5 rays, and the pectoral fins are typically shorter than the head. The body, fins, and head, with the except of the front of the snout, are covered in scales. The lips are thick, with strong curved incisors at the front of the mouth, with smaller teeth behind the front incisors.

Ecology

Diet
The species usually feeds on red and coraline seaweed and red bait, small mussels and barnacles found off rocky shores, and appear in particular to be a partial to the white mussels residing in the sandy beaches and inlets of the rocky outcrops along the southern coast.

Home area
In 2005, the movements of the species were extensively studied. Some 25,000 galjoen were tagged at four sites in reserves in South Africa and it was concluded that their overall movement remained localised, with some 95% of fish studied seeming to indicate a particular area.

Importance to humans

Fishing
It is important to local commercial fisheries and is also popular as a game fish.

As food
Due to their abundance in the shores off South Africa, galjoen is common in South African cuisine. A notable dish is the fish is sprinkled with pepper and lemon, or with lemon, mayonnaise and melted garlic butter and served with fresh bread and apricot jam.

As the national fish of South Africa
Galjoen is the national fish of South Africa.  The suggestion to make it the national fish came from Margaret Smith, wife of the ichthyologist J. L. B. Smith, to find a marine equivalent to the Springbok.

Etymology
The scientific name of Coracinus capensis is a reference to its black colour when found in rocky areas, Coracinus meaning "raven" or "black coloured"; in sandy areas it gives off a silver-bronze colour.

References

Dichistiidae
National symbols of South Africa
Taxa named by Georges Cuvier
Fish described in 1831